The surname Gessen is a transliteration of the Russian spelling "Гессен" of the surname of Russified persons coming from the House of Hesse, including the last ruling Russian Empress Alix of Hesse: , .

The surname may refer to:

Boris Hessen (1893–1936), Soviet physicist, philosopher, and historian of science, whose surname is sometimes transliterated as Gessen
 (1866—1943), Russian lawyer, statesman, and essayist
Keith Gessen (born 1975), Russian-born American novelist, journalist, and editor
Masha Gessen (born 1967), Russian and American journalist, author, translator, and activist
 (1887-1950), Russian philosopher, educator and publisher
Vladimir Gessen (disambiguation), which may refer to:
Vladimir Augusto Gessen Rodríguez, Venezuelan politician, journalist and psychologist
Vladimir Matveevich Gessen (1868–1920), Russian jurist and politician

See also
Hessen (disambiguation)

Russian-language surnames